Malherbe may refer to:

People 
 Malherbe (surname)
 François de Malherbe (1555-1628), French poet, reformer of French language

Places

France 
 La Haye-Malherbe, municipality of Eure
 Malherbe-sur-Ajon, new municipality of Calvados
 Saint-Agnan-le-Malherbe, a delegated district
 Neuilly-le-Malherbe, former municipality of Calvados merged in 1972 into Vacognes-Neuilly
 Crêt Malherbe, culminating point (946 m) of the Monts du Lyonnais
 Pointe de Malherbe, rocky cape on the Var coast

England 
 Boughton Malherbe, civil parish of Kent
 Cricket Malherbie, village of Knowle St Giles, civil parish of Somerset

Algeria 
 Aghlal, town of the district of Aïn Témouchent, formerly named De Malherbe

Space 
 260724 Malherbe, asteroid

Science and literature 
 Malherbe's parakeet, species of parakeet
 Pilomatricoma, also known as a calcifying epithelioma of Malherbe
 Prix Henry Malherbe, French literary prize

Other uses 
 Lycée Malherbe, a secondary school in Caen, France
 Stade Malherbe Caen, a sporting club originating from the lycée
 Château de Malherbes, château and vineyard in Latresne, Gironde, France